An alcohol enema, also known colloquially as butt-chugging or boofing, is the act of introducing alcohol into the rectum and colon via the anus, i.e., as an enema. This method of alcohol consumption can be dangerous and even deadly because it leads to faster intoxication than drinking since the alcohol is absorbed directly into the bloodstream and bypasses the body's ability to reject the toxin by vomiting.

Administration
Two reported techniques specific to alcohol enemas are by inserting into the rectum either an alcohol-soaked tampon or tubing connected to a funnel into which alcohol is poured, known as a beer bong.

Enema bags of the sort used medically, e.g., to remedy constipation, are also employed.

Effects and dangers
Compared to drinking, alcohol intoxication begins far more quickly upon rectal consumption since the alcohol is absorbed directly into the bloodstream. The lower gastrointestinal tract lacks the alcohol dehydrogenase enzyme present in the stomach and liver that breaks down ethanol into acetylaldehyde, which is actually more toxic than ethanol (drinking alcohol) and is responsible for most chronic effects of ethanol. When rectally absorbed, ethanol will still eventually arrive at the liver, but the high alcohol content could overwhelm the organ. Additionally, consuming the alcohol rectally neutralizes the body's ability to reject the toxin by vomiting.

Native American ritual usages
The Maya ritually administered enemas of alcohol as an entheogen, sometimes adding other psychoactive substances, seeking to reach a state of ecstasy. Syringes of gourd and clay were used to inject the fluid.

Incidents
In May 2004, a 58-year-old man of Lake Jackson, Texas, died after his wife administered an alcohol enema. In total, the man is thought to have been given at least three liters of sherry (containing at least 45 cL alcohol). He suffered from alcoholism and had difficulty ingesting alcohol orally because of a painful throat ailment. His wife was indicted on a charge of negligent homicide. In August 2007, prosecutors dropped the charges due to insufficient evidence.

An enema bag filled with white wine and taken as a self-administered enema killed a 52-year-old man with klismaphilia. He was found dead with the nozzle still inserted in his anus and connected to an enema bag that hung from a coat rack next to his bed.

See also
 Alcohol inhalation
 Vodka eyeballing

References

Drinking culture
Rectum
Alcohol and health
Substance-related disorders